

G

Ga – Ge 

Gabrielite (IMA2002-053) 2.HD.60(IUPAC: dithallium silver dicopper heptasulfur triarsenide)
Gabrielsonite (IMA2017-G, IMA1966-011) 8.BH.35 (IUPAC: lead iron(III) hydro arsenite)
Gachingite (IMA2021-008) [no] [no]
Gadolinite 9.AJ.20 (IUPAC: diREE iron(II) diberyllium dioxy disilicate)
Gadolinite-(Ce) (IMA1987 s.p., 1978) 9.AJ.20
Gadolinite-(Nd) (IMA2016-013) 9.AJ.20 [no] [no]
Gadolinite-(Y) (IMA1987 s.p., 1802) 9.AJ.20 
Gagarinite (gagarinite) 3.AB.35 (IUPAC: sodium calcium REE hexafluoride)
Gagarinite-(Ce) (IMA2010-C, IMA1993-038 Rd) 3.AB.35 
Gagarinite-(Y) (IMA1967 s.p., 1961) 3.AB.35 
Gageite (Y: 1910) 9.DH.35  
Gahnite (spinel, spinel: 1807) 4.BB.05 (IUPAC: zinc dialuminium tetraoxide)
Gaidonnayite (gaidonnayite: IMA1973-008) 9.DM.15(IUPAC: disodium zirconium trisilicate nonaoxy hydrate)
Gainesite (IMA1978-020) 8.CA.20 
Gaitite (fairfieldite: IMA1978-047) 8.CG.05  (IUPAC: dicalcium zinc diarsenate dihydrate)
Gajardoite (IMA2015-040) 4.0 [no] [no]
Galaxite (spinel, spinel: 1932) 4.BB.05 (IUPAC: manganese(II) dialuminium tetraoxide)
Galeaclolusite (IMA2020-052) 8.DD [no] [no]
Galeite (IMA1967 s.p., 1963) 7.BD.10 (IUPAC: pentadecasodium chloro tetrafluoro pentasulfate)
Galena (galena, rocksalt: Pliny the Elder) 2.CD.10 (IUPAC: lead sulfide)
Galenobismutite (kobellite: 1878) 2.JC.25e (IUPAC: lead dibismuth tetrasulfide)
Galgenbergite-(Ce) (IMA1997-036) 5.CC.40 (IUPAC: calcium dicerium tetracarbonate monohydrate)
Galileiite (fillowite: IMA1996-028) 8.AC.50(IUPAC: sodium tetrairon(II) triphosphate)
Galkhaite (tennantite: IMA1971-029) 2.GB.20  (IUPAC: (pentamercury copper) caesium dodecasulfide tetrarsenide)
Galliskiite (IMA2009-038) 8.0 [no] [no] (IUPAC: tetracalcium dialuminium octafluoro diphosphate pentahydrate)
Gallite (chalcopyrite: 1958) 2.CB.10a  (IUPAC: copper gallium disulfide)
Gallobeudantite (beudantite, alunite: IMA1994-021) 8.BL.05 (IUPAC: lead trigallium hexahydro arsenate sulfate)
Galloplumbogummite (alunite, crandallite: IMA2010-088) 8.B?. [no] [no]
Galuskinite (IMA2010-075) 9.0 [no]  (IUPAC: heptacalcium trisilicate carbonate)
Gamagarite (brackebuschite: 1943) 8.BG.05 (IUPAC: dibarium iron(III) hydro divanadate)
Gananite (IMA1983-006) 3.AC.20 (IUPAC: bismuth trifluoride)
Ganomalite (ganomalite: 1876) 9.BG.25 (IUPAC: nonalead hexacalcium tetra(heptaoxodisilicate) oxy(tetraoxysilicate))
Ganophyllite (Y: 1890) 9.EG.30
Ganterite (mica: IMA2000-033) 9.EC.15 
Gaotaiite (pyrite: IMA1993-017) 2.EB.05a (IUPAC: triiridium octatelluride)
Garavellite (berthierite: IMA1978-018) 2.HA.20 (IUPAC: iron tetrasulfa antimonide bismuthide)
Garmite (mica: IMA2017-008) 9.E?. [no] [no] (IUPAC: caesium lithium dimagnesium (decaoxytetrasilicate) difluoride)
Garpenbergite (IMA2020-099) [no] [no]
Garrelsite (Y: 1955) 9.AJ.15 
Garronite (zeolitic tectosilicate) 9.GC.05
Garronite-Ca (IMA1997 s.p., 1962) 9.GC.05
Garronite-Na (IMA2015-15) 9.GC.05 [no] 
Gartrellite (tsumcorite: IMA1988-039 Rd) 8.CG.20 (IUPAC: lead copper iron(III) hydro diarsenate monohydrate)
Garutiite (alloy: IMA2008-055) 1.AG.05 [no] (IUPAC: (nickel,iron,iridium) alloy)
Garyansellite (reddingite: IMA1981-019) 8.CC.05 (IUPAC: dimagnesium iron(III) hydro diphosphate dihydrate)
Gasparite (monazite) 8.AD.50 (IUPAC: REE arsenate)
Gasparite-(Ce) (IMA1986-031) 8.AD.50
Gasparite-(La) (IMA2018-079) 8.AD.50  [no] [no]
Gaspéite (calcite: IMA1965-029) 5.AB.05 Gaspéite Gaspeite Mineral Data  (IUPAC: nickel carbonate)
Gatedalite (braunite: IMA2013-091) 9.A?.  [no] [no] (IUPAC: zirconium dimanganese(II) tetramanganese(III) octaoxy tetraoxysilicate)
Gatehouseite (arsenoclasite: IMA1992-016) 8.BD.10 Gatehouseite Gatehouseite Mineral Data  (IUPAC: pentamanganese tetrahydro diphosphate)
Gatelite-(Ce) (gatelite: IMA2001-050) 9.BG.50 [no]
Gatewayite (polyoxometalate: IMA2014-096) 4.0 [no] [no]
Gatumbaite (IMA1976-019) 8.DJ.10  Gatumbaite Mineral Data (IUPAC: calcium dialuminium dihydro diphosphate monohydrate)
Gaudefroyite (IMA1964-006) 6.AB.60  Gaudefroyite Mineral Data (IUPAC: tetracalcium trimanganese(III) trioxo triborate carbonate)
Gaultite (zeolitic tectosilicate: IMA1992-040) 9.GF.20  Gaultite Mineral Data [no]
Gauthierite (IMA2016-004) 4.0 Gauthierite [no] [no] (IUPAC: potassium lead heptauranyl heptahydro pentoxide octahydrate)
Gayite (dufrenite: IMA2008-056) 8.DK.15 Gayite [no] [no] (IUPAC: sodium manganese(II) pentairon(III) hexahydro tetraphosphate diphosphate)
Gaylussite (Y: 1826) 5.CB.35(IUPAC: disodium calcium dicarbonate pentahydrate)
Gazeevite (zadovite, arctite: IMA2015-037) 9.0 [no] [no] (IUPAC: barium hexacalcium di(tetraoxysilicate) oxo(disulfate))
Gearksutite (IMA1962 s.p., 1868) 3.CC.05 (IUPAC: calcium hydro tetrafluoroaluminate monohydrate)
Gebhardite (IMA1979-071) 4.JB.50 (IUPAC: octalead hexachloro di(pentoxydiarsenic) oxide)
Gedrite [Mg-Fe-Mn-amphibole: IMA2012 s.p., 1836] 9.DD.05
Geerite (IMA1978-024) 2.BA.05  (IUPAC: octacopper pentasulfide)
Geffroyite (pentlandite: IMA1980-090) 2.BB.15 
Gehlenite (melilite: 1815) 9.BB.10 (IUPAC: dicalcium aluminium (heptaoxyalumosilicate))
Geigerite (lindackerite: IMA1985-028) 8.CE.05  Geigerite Mineral Data  (IUPAC: pentamanganese(II) diarsenate di(hydrogenarsenate) decahydrate)
Geikielite (corundum: 1893) 4.CB.05  Geikielite Mineral Data  (IUPAC: magnesium titanium trioxide)
Gelosaite (gelosaite: IMA2009-022) 7.0  [no] [no]
Geminite (IMA1988-045) 8.CB.30  Geminite Mineral Data (IUPAC: copper(II) hydroxoarsenate monohydrate)
Gengenbachite (IMA2001-003b) 8.CA.65   [no] (IUPAC: potassium triiron(III) di(dihydroxophosphate) tetrahydroxophosphate hexahydrate)
Genkinite (IMA1976-051) 2.AC.35a   (IUPAC: tetraplatinum triantimonide)
Genplesite (fleischerite: IMA2014-034) 7.0  [no] [no] (IUPAC: tricalcium tin hexahydro disulfate trihydrate)
Genthelvite (cancrinite-sodalite: 1892) 9.FB.10   (IUPAC: triberyllium tetrazinc trisilicate sulfide)
Geocronite (geocronite: 1839) 2.JB.30a  
Georgbarsanovite (eudialyte: IMA2003-013) 9.CO.10 
Georgbokiite (IMA1996-015) 4.JG.05   (IUPAC: pentacopper dioxo dichloro diselenite)
Georgechaoite (IMA1984-024) 9.DM.15   (IUPAC: potassium sodium zirconium nonaoxytrisilicate dihydrate)
George-ericksenite (IMA1996-049) 4.KD.10    (IUPAC: hexasodium calcium magnesium hexaiodate dichromate dodecahydrate)
Georgeite (amorphous: IMA1977-004 Rd) 5.BA.10   (IUPAC: dicopper dihydro carbonate)
Georgerobinsonite (IMA2009-068) 7.0  [no] [no] (IUPAC: tetralead dihydro fluoro chloro dichromate)
Georgiadesite (Y: 1907) 4.JB.70   (IUPAC: tetralead tetrachloro hydro arsenite)
Gerasimovskite (Y: 1957) 4.FM.25    (IUPAC: manganese(II) penta(titanium,niobium) dodecaoxide nonahydrate(?))
Gerdtremmelite (IMA1983-049a) 8.BE.40    (IUPAC: zinc dialuminium pentahydro arsenate)
Gerenite-(Y) (IMA1993-034) 9.CJ.45   [no]
Gerhardtite (Y: 1885) 5.NB.05    (IUPAC: dicopper trihydro nitrate)
Germanite (germanite: 1922) 2.CB.30    (IUPAC: tridecacopper diiron digermanium hexadecasulfide)
Germanocolusite (germanite: IMA1991-044) 2.CB.30    (IUPAC: tridecacopper vanadium trigermanium hexadecasulfide)
Gersdorffite (IMA1986 s.p., 1845 Rd) 2.EB.25  (IUPAC: nickel arsenide sulfide) Polytypes: Pa3 (pyrite group), P213 (ullmannite group), Pca21 (cobaltite group)
Gerstleyite (Y: 1956) 2.HE.05  (IUPAC: disodium octa(antimonide,arsenide) tridecasulfide dihydrate)
Gerstmannite (IMA1975-030) 9.AE.25    (IUPAC: manganese(II) magnesium zinc tetraoxysilicate tetrahydroxyl)
Geschieberite (IMA2014-006) 7.0  [no] [no] (IUPAC: dipotassium uranyl disulfate dihydrate)
Getchellite (IMA1965-010) 2.FA.35    (IUPAC: antimony arsenide trisulfide)
Geversite (pyrite: IMA1967 s.p., 1961) 2.EB.05a    (IUPAC: platinum diantimonide)

Gh – Gy 
Ghiaraite (IMA2012-072) 3.0  [no] [no] (IUPAC: calcium dichloride tetrahydrate)
Giacovazzoite (IMA2018-165) 7.0  [no] [no]
Gianellaite (IMA1972-020) 3.DD.30    (IUPAC: hydrous di(dimercury nitride) sulfate)
Gibbsite (IMA1962 s.p., 1822) 4.FE.10    (IUPAC: aluminium trihydroxide)
Giessenite (kobellite: IMA1963-004) 2.HB.10b   
Giftgrubeite (hureaulite: IMA2016-102) 8.0  [no] [no] (IUPAC: calcium dimanganese dicalcium diarsenate di(hydroxoarsenate) tetrahydrate)
Gilalite (IMA1979-021) 9.HE.05    (Cu5Si6O17·7H2O)
Gillardite (atacamite: IMA2006-041) 3.DA.10c   [no] (IUPAC: tricopper(II) nickel dichloride hexahydroxide)
Gillespite (gillespite: 1922) 9.EA.05    (BaFe2+Si4O10)
Gillulyite (IMA1989-029) 2.JC.10    (Tl2As7.5Sb0.3S13)
Gilmarite (gilmarite: IMA1996-017) 8.BE.25    (IUPAC: tricopper(II) trihydro arsenate)
Giniite (IMA1977-017) 8.DB.50    (IUPAC: iron(II) tetrairon(III) dihydro tetraphosphate dihydrate)
Ginorite (Y: 1934) 6.FC.15    (Ca2B14O20(OH)6·5H2O)
GiorgiositeQ (Y: 1879) 5.DA.05   
Giraudite-(Zn) (tetrahedrite: IMA2018-K, IMA1980-089) 2.GB.05    (Cu6(Cu4Zn2)As4Se13)
Girvasite (IMA1988-046) 8.DO.05    (NaCa2Mg3(PO4)2[PO2(OH)2](CO3)(OH)2·4H2O)
Gismondine (zeolitic tectosilicate) 9.GC.05
Gismondine-BaH (2001) 9.GC.05  [no] [no]
Gismondine-Ca (IMA1997 s.p., 1817) 9.GC.05   
Gismondine-Sr (IMA2021-043) 9.GC.05 [no] [no] [no]
Gittinsite (thortveitite: IMA1979-034) 9.BC.05    (IUPAC: calcium zirconium heptaoxo disilicate)
Giuseppettite (cancrinite-sodalite: IMA1979-064) 9.FB.05   
Gjerdingenite (labuntsovite) 9.CE.30c
Gjerdingenite-Ca (IMA2005-029) 9.CE.30c   
Gjerdingenite-Fe (IMA2001-009) 9.CE.30c   [no]
Gjerdingenite-Mn (IMA2003-015) 9.CE.30c   [no]
Gjerdingenite-Na (IMA2005-030) 9.CE.30c   
Gladite (meneghinite: 1924) 2.HB.05a    (CuPbBi5S9)
Gladiusite (IMA1998-011) 8.DF.40    (IUPAC: diiron(III) tetrairon(II) undecahydro phosphate monohydrate)
Gladkovskyite (IMA2018-098) 2.0  [no] [no] (MnTlAs3S6)
Glagolevite (IMA2001-064) 9.EC.55   [no]
Glauberite (Y: 1808) 7.AD.25    (IUPAC: disodium calcium disulfate)
Glaucocerinite (hydrotalcite: 1932) 7.DD.35   
Glaucochroite (olivine: 1899) 9.AC.05    (IUPAC: calcium manganese(II) tetraoxysilicate)
Glaucodot (arsenopyrite: 1849) 2.EB.10c    ((Co0.5Fe0.5)AsS)
(Glauconite, mica series (Y: 1927) 9.EC.   )
Glaucophane [Na-amphibole: IMA2012 s.p., 1845] 9.DE.25   
Glaukosphaerite (malachite: IMA1972-028) 5.BA.10    (IUPAC: copper nickel dihydro carbonate)
Glikinite (IMA2018-119) 7.0  [no] [no] (IUPAC: trizinc oxo(disulfate))
Glucine (IMA1967 s.p., 1963) 8.DA.45    (CaBe4(PO4)2(OH)4·0.5H2O)
Glushinskite (humboldtine: IMA1985-Q Rd) 10.AB.10    (IUPAC: magnesium oxalate dihydrate)
Gmalimite (djerfisherite: IMA2019-007) 2.0  [no] [no] (K6☐Fe2+24S27)
Gmelinite (zeolitic tectosilicate) 9.GD.05
Gmelinite-Ca (IMA1997 s.p.) 9.GD.05   [no]
Gmelinite-K (IMA1999-039) 9.GD.05   [no]
Gmelinite-Na (IMA1997 s.p., 1825) 9.GD.05   
Gobbinsite (zeolitic tectosilicate: IMA1980-070) 9.GC.05   
Gobelinite (ktenasite: IMA2018-167) 7.0  [no] [no] (IUPAC: cobalt tetracopper hexahydro disulfate hexahydrate)
Godlevskite (pentlandite: IMA1968-032) 2.BB.15    (IUPAC: nona(nickel,iron) octasulfide)
Godovikovite (sabieite: IMA1987-019) 7.AC.20    (IUPAC: ammonium aluminium disulfate)
Goedkenite (brackebuschite: IMA1974-004) 8.BG.05    (IUPAC: distrontium aluminium hydro diphosphate)
Goethite ("O(OH)" group: IMA1980 s.p., 1919) 4.F    (IUPAC: hydro α-iron(III) oxide)
Gold (element: old) 1.AA.05   
Goldfieldite (tetrahedrite: IMA2018-K, 1909 Rd) 2.GB.05    ((Cu4☐2)Cu6Te4S13)
Goldhillite (IMA2021-034)  [no] [no]
Goldichite (Y: 1955) 7.CC.40    (IUPAC: potassium iron(III) disulfate tetrahydrate)
Goldmanite (garnet, garnet: IMA1963-003) 9.AD.25    (IUPAC: tricalcium divanadium(III) tri(tetraoxysilicate))
Goldquarryite (IMA2001-058) 8.DB.65   [no] (IUPAC: copper dicadmium trialuminium trifluoro tetraphosphate decahydrate)
Goldschmidtite (perovskite: IMA2018-034) 4.C  [no] [no] (IUPAC: potassium niobium trioxide)
Golyshevite (eudialyte: IMA2004-039) 9.CO.10   
Gonnardite (zeolitic tectosilicate: IMA1997 s.p., 1896 Rd) 9.GA.05   
Gonyerite (chlorite: 1955) 9.EC.55   
Goosecreekite (zeolitic tectosilicate: IMA1980-004) 9.GB.25   
Gorbunovite (mica: IMA2017-040) 9.E?.  [no] [no]
Gorceixite (alunite, crandallite: 1906) 8.BL.10    (IUPAC: barium trialuminium hexahydro phosphate hydroxophosphate)
Gordaite (ktenasite: IMA1996-006) 7.DF.50    (IUPAC: sodium tetrazinc hexahydro chloro sulfate hexahydrate)
Gordonite (laueite, laueite: 1930) 8.DC.30    (IUPAC: magnesium dialuminium dihydro diphosphate octahydrate)
Gorerite (magnetoplumbite: IMA2019-080) 4.0  [no] [no]
Görgeyite (Y: 1953) 7.CD.30    (IUPAC: dipotassium pentacalcium hexasulfate monohydrate)
Gormanite (souzalite: IMA1977-030) 8.DC.45    (IUPAC: triiron(II) tetraluminium hexahydro tetraphosphate dihydrate)
Gortdrumite (IMA1979-039) 2.BD.10    (Cu24Fe2Hg9S23)
Goryainovite (IMA2015-090) 8.0  [no] [no] (IUPAC: dicalcium phosphate chloride)
Goslarite (epsomite: 1845) 7.CB.40    (IUPAC: zinc sulfate heptahydrate)
Gottardiite (zeolitic tectosilicate: IMA1994-054) 9.GF.10   [no]
Gottlobite (adelite: IMA1998-066) 8.BH.35   [no] (IUPAC: calcium magnesium hydro vanadate)
Götzenite (seidozerite, rinkite: IMA1962 s.p., 1957) 9.BE.22   
Goudeyite (mixite: IMA1978-015) 8.DL.15    (IUPAC: hexacopper aluminium hexahydro triarsenate trihydrate)
Gowerite (IMA1962 s.p., 1959) 6.EC.10   
Goyazite (alunite, crandallite: IMA1999 s.p., 1884 Rd) 8.BL.10    (IUPAC: strontium trialuminium hexahydro phosphate hydroxophosphate hydrate)
Graemite (tellurite: IMA1974-022) 4.JM.15    (IUPAC: copper(II) tellurite monohydrate)
Graeserite (IMA1996-010) 4.JB.55   [no] (Fe3+4Ti3As3+O13(OH))
Graftonite 8.AB.20
Graftonite (Y: 1900) 8.AB.20    (IUPAC: iron(II) diiron(II) diphosphate)
Graftonite-(Ca) (IMA2017-048) 8.AB.20  [no] [no] (IUPAC: calcium diiron(II) diphosphate)
Graftonite-(Mn) (IMA2017-050) 8.AB.20  [no] [no] (IUPAC: manganese diiron(II) diphosphate)
Gramaccioliite-(Y) (crichtonite: IMA2001-034) 4.CC.40   
Grammatikopoulosite (phosphide: IMA2019-090) 1.0  [no] [no] (IUPAC: nickel vanadium phosphide)
Grandaite (brackebuschite: IMA2013-059) 8.B?.  [no]  (IUPAC: distrontium aluminium hydro diarsenate)
Grandidierite (Y: 1902) 9.AJ.05    (MgAl3O2(BO3)(SiO4))
Grandreefite (IMA1988-016) 7.BD.45    (IUPAC: dilead difluoro sulfate)
Grandviewite (IMA2007-004) 7.BB.60   [no] (Cu3Al9(SO4)2(OH)29)
Grantsite (hewettite: IMA1967 s.p., 1964) 4.HG.55  
Graphite (Y: 1789) 1.CB.05a   
Graţianite (berthierite: IMA2013-076) 2.0  [no] [no] (IUPAC: manganese dibismuth tetrasulfide)
Gratonite (Y: 1940) 2.JB.55    (IUPAC: nonalead tetrarsenide pentadecasulfide)
Grattarolaite (IMA1995-037) 8.BE.10    (IUPAC: triiron(III) trioxophosphate)
Graulichite (alunite, crandallite) 8.BL.13 (IUPAC: REE triiron(III) hexahydro diarsenate)
Graulichite-(Ce) (alunite, crandallite: IMA2002-001) 8.BL.13   [no]
Graulichite-(La) (alunite, crandallite: IMA2020-093) 8.BL.13  [no] [no]
Gravegliaite (gravegliaite: IMA1990-020) 4.JE.05    (IUPAC: manganese(II) sulfite trihydrate)
Grayite (rhabdophane: 1957) 8.CJ.45    (IUPAC: thorium phosphate monohydrate)
Grechishchevite (IMA1988-027) 2.FC.15c    (Hg3S2BrCl0.5I0.5)
Greenalite (serpentine: 1903) 9.ED.15   
Greenlizardite (IMA2017-001) 7.E?.  [no] [no]
Greenockite (wurtzite: 1840) 2.CB.45    (IUPAC: cadmium sulfide)
Greenwoodite (IMA2010-007) 9.A?.  [no] 
Gregoryite (IMA1981-045) 5.AA.10    (IUPAC: disodium carbonate)
Greifensteinite (roscherite: IMA2001-044) 8.DA.10    (Ca2Be4Fe2+5(PO4)6(OH)4·6H2O)
Greigite (spinel, linnaeite: IMA1963-007) 2.DA.05    (IUPAC: iron(II) diiron(III) tetrasulfide)
Grenmarite (seidozerite, rinkite: IMA2003-024) 9.BE.25   [no]
Grguricite (dresserite: IMA2019-123) 5.0  [no] [no] (IUPAC: calcium dichromium tetrahydro dicarbonate tetrahydrate)
Griceite (halite, rocksalt: IMA1986-043) 3.AA.20    (IUPAC: lithium fluoride)
Griffinite (IMA2021-110) 4.CB.  [no] [no]
Grigorievite (howardevansite: IMA2012-047) 8.0  [no]  (IUPAC: tricopper diiron(III) dialuminium hexavanadate)
Grimaldiite ("O(OH)" group: IMA1967-036) 4.FE.20    (IUPAC: hydrochromium oxide)
Grimmite (linnaeite: IMA2020-060) 2.0  [no] [no]
Grimselite (IMA1971-040) 5.ED.35    (IUPAC: tripotassium sodium uranyl tricarbonate monohydrate)
Griphite (Y: 1891) 8.BF.15   
Grischunite (wicksite: IMA1981-028) 8.CF.05   
Groatite (alluaudite: IMA2008-054) 8.AC.10  [no]  (☐NaCaMn2(PO4)(HPO4)2)
Grokhovskyite (IMA2019-065) 2.0  [no] [no] (IUPAC: copper chromium disulfide)
Grootfonteinite (IMA2015-051) 5.0  [no] [no] (IUPAC: trilead oxodicarbonate)
Grossite (IMA1993-052) 4.CC.15    (IUPAC: calcium tetraluminium heptaoxide)
Grossmanite (pyroxene: IMA2008-042a) 9.DA.15   [no]
Grossular (garnet, garnet: IMA1962 s.p., 1811) 9.AD.25    (IUPAC: tricalcium dialuminium tri(tetraoxysilicate))
Groutite ("O(OH)" group: 1947) 4.FD.10    (IUPAC: hydromanganese(III) oxide)
Grumantite (IMA1985-029) 9.EH.10    (NaSi2O4(OH)·H2O)
Grumiplucite (pavonite: IMA1997-021) 2.JA.05b    (IUPAC: mercury dibismuth tetrasulfide)
Grundmannite (chalcostibite: IMA2015-038) 2.0  [no] [no] (IUPAC: copper bismuth diselenide)
Grunerite [Mg-Fe-Mn-amphibole: IMA2012 s.p., IMA1997 s.p., 1853] 9.DE.05   
Gruzdevite (nowackiite: IMA1980-053) 2.GA.30    (Cu6Hg3Sb4S12)
Guanacoite (IMA2003-021) 8.DD.10   [no] (IUPAC: dicopper trimagnesium tetrahydro diarsenate tetrahydrate)
Guanajuatite (stibnite: 1858) 2.DB.05    (IUPAC: dibismuth triselenide)
Guanine (IMA1973-056) 10.CA.30   
Guarinoite (guarinoite: IMA1991-005) 7.DD.80    (IUPAC: hexazinc decahydro sulfate pentahydrate)
Gudmundite (arsenopyrite: 1928) 2.EB.20    (IUPAC: iron antimonide sulfide)
Guérinite (IMA2007 s.p., 1961) 8.CJ.75    (IUPAC: pentacalcium di(hydroxoarsenate) diarsenate nonahydrate)
Guettardite (sartorite: IMA1966-018) 2.HC.05a    (Pb8(Sb0.56As0.44)16S32)
Gugiaite (melilite: IMA1983-072) 9.BB.10    (IUPAC: dicalcium beryllium heptaoxy disilicate)
Guidottiite (serpentine: IMA2009-061) 9.ED.15  [no] 
Guildite (Y: 1928) 7.DC.30    (IUPAC: copper iron(III) hydro disulfate tetrahydrate)
Guilleminite (IMA1964-031) 4.JJ.10    (IUPAC: barium triuranyl dioxodiselenite trihydrate)
Guimarãesite (roscherite: IMA2006-028) 8.DA.10   [no] (Ca2Be4Zn5(PO4)6(OH)4·6H2O)
Guite (spinel: IMA2017-080) 4.0  [no] [no] (IUPAC: cobalt(II) dicobalt(III) tetraoxide)
Gunningite (kieserite: IMA1962 s.p.) 7.CB.05    (IUPAC: zinc sulfate monohydrate)
Günterblassite (günterblassite: IMA2011-032) 9.0  [no] [no]
Gunterite (decavanadate: IMA2011-001) 8.0  [no]  (Na4(H2O)16(H2V10O28)·6H2O)
Gupeiite (silicide: IMA1983-087) 1.BB.30    (IUPAC: triiron silicide)
Gurimite (palmierite: IMA2013-032) 8.0  [no] [no] (IUPAC: tribarium divanadate)
Gurzhiite (IMA2021-086)
Gustavite (lillianite: IMA1967-048) 2.JB.40a    (IUPAC: silver lead hexasulfide tribismuthide)
Gutkovaite-Mn (labuntsovite: IMA2001-038) 9.CE.30h   [no]
Guyanaite ("O(OH)" group: IMA1967-034) 4.FD.10    (IUPAC: hydrochromium oxide)
Gwihabaite (IMA1994-011) 5.NA.15    (IUPAC: ammonium nitrate)
Gypsum [gypsos (Theophrastus), gypsum (Agricola, G., 1546)] 7.CD.40    (IUPAC: calcium sulfate dihydrate)
Gyrolite (gyrolite: 1851) 9.EE.30   
Gysinite
Gysinite-(La) (IMA2022-008)
Gysinite-(Nd) (ancylite: IMA1981-046) 5.DC.05    (IUPAC: lead neodymium hydro dicarbonate monohydrate)

References

External links
IMA Database of Mineral Properties/ RRUFF Project
Mineralatlas.eu minerals F and G